Sir John Marsham, 1st Baronet (23 August 1602 – 25 May 1685) was an English antiquary known as a writer on chronology. He was also a chancery clerk and politician who sat in the House of Commons from 1660 to 1661.

Life
Marsham was second son of Thomas Marsham, alderman of London, by Magdalen, daughter of Richard Springham, a London merchant. After attending Westminster School he matriculated at St John's College, Oxford, on 22 October 1619; he graduated B.A. on 17 February 1623, M.A. on 5 July 1625. He spent the winter of 1625 in Paris. In 1626 and 1627 he travelled in France, Italy, and Germany, and then returned to London, where he became a member of the Middle Temple in 1627. In 1629 he went through Holland and Gelderland to the siege of 's-Hertogenbosch in Brabant; and then by Flushing to Boulogne and Paris in the retinue of Sir Thomas Edmondes, ambassador extraordinary at the court of Louis XIII.

Marsham was made one of the six clerks in chancery on 15 February 1638. On the outbreak of the First English Civil War he followed the king to Oxford, and was consequently deprived of his place by Parliament. After the surrender of Oxford he returned to London (1646), and having compounded for his estate, he lived in retirement at his seat of Whorn Place, in the parish of Cuxton, Kent. 

In April 1660, Marsham was elected a Member of Parliament (MP) for Rochester in the Convention Parliament. At the Restoration, he was restored to his place in chancery, and was knighted. On 12 August 1663 he was created a baronet. He was allowed to hand over his clerkship to his son Robert on 20 October 1680. 

Marsham died at Bushey Hall, Hertfordshire, on 25 May 1685, and was buried in Cuxton Church. By Elizabeth (1612–1689), daughter of Sir William Hammond of St. Albans Court in Nonington, Kent, he had two sons, John and Robert, and a daughter Elizabeth. He was succeeded initially by the eldest son John, who purchased the Mote in Maidstone and who died in 1692 when High Sheriff of Kent, but when John's own son John died young the baronetcy and Mote estate reverted to Robert.

Works
Marsham had a reputation in his day for his knowledge of history, chronology, and languages. According to Wotton, Marsham was the first who made Egyptian antiquities intelligible. Hallam also commended his work.

He wrote Diatriba Chronologica, London, 1649, a dissertation in which he examined difficulties in the chronology of the Old Testament. Most of it was afterwards inserted in his more elaborate Chronicus Canon Ægypticus, Ebraicus, Græcus, et disquisitiones, London, 1672, a beautifully printed book (other editions, 4to, Leipzig, 1676, and 4to, Franeker, 1699, but both inaccurate). He wrote also the preface to the first volume of Roger Dodsworth and William Dugdale's Monasticon Anglicanum (1655), which is entitled Propylaion Johannis Marshami; it is a complex survey of English monasticism.

He left unfinished Canonis Chronici liber quintus: sive Imperium Persicum, De Provinciis et Legionibus Romanis, De re nummaria, and other treatises. His nephew Thomas Stanley dedicated to him his History of Philosophy (1655).

References

Attribution

English MPs 1660
Chronologists
1602 births
1685 deaths
Baronets in the Baronetage of England
People educated at Westminster School, London
Alumni of St John's College, Oxford
Members of the Middle Temple
17th-century English writers
17th-century English male writers
People from Cuxton